Good Piranha / Bad Piranha is a modern jazz album by Wayne Krantz. The album consists of four songs played in two separate sets with two intertwined trios. Songs themselves are only being thematically utilized as vehicles for improvisation, containing only main themes from the original songs with everything else being completely improvised. Krantz elaborated on this in the liner notes of the album"Did some cover nights a while ago at 55 Bar. Realized it didn’t matter what songs we play, we still do our thing. These songs are fine, but it could have been anything. Went into the studio for 2 days, cut loose. Still like playing guitar.”

Track listing

 "Black Swan"  – 6:04
 "My Skin Is My Sin" – 5:04
 "Comprachicos" – 7:42
 "U Can't Touch This" – 4:21
 "Black Swan (Alternate)"  – 6:56
 "My Skin Is My Sin (Alternate Version)" – 3:47
 "Comprachicos (Alternate Version)" – 2:43
 "U Can't Touch This (Alternate Version)" – 4:53

Personnel
 Wayne Krantz – guitar
 Nate Wood – bass guitar, drums
 Tim Lefebvre – bass guitar
 Keith Carlock – drums 
 Gabriela Anders – vocals

References

Wayne Krantz albums
2014 albums
Abstract Logix albums